199 (one hundred [and] ninety-nine) is the natural number following 198 and preceding 200.

In mathematics
199 is a centered triangular number.

It is a prime number and the fourth part of a prime quadruplet: 191, 193, 197, 199.

199 is the smallest natural number that takes more than two iterations to compute its digital root as a repeated digit sum:

Thus, its additive persistence is three, and it is the smallest number of persistence three.

See also
 The year AD 199 or 199 BC
 List of highways numbered 199

References

Integers